The men's sanda 52 kg at the 1998 Asian Games in Bangkok, Thailand was held from 16 to 19 December at the Thammasat Gymnasium 6.

Sanda, formerly knows as Sanshou is the official Chinese full contact combat sport. Sanda (Sanshou) is a fighting system which was originally developed by the Chinese military based upon the study and practices of traditional Kung fu and modern combat fighting techniques.

A total of 10 men from 10 different countries competed in this event, limited to fighters whose body weight was less than 52 kilograms.

Xing Zhijie from China won the gold medal after beating Rolly Chulhang of the Philippines in gold medal bout 2–0, The bronze medal was shared by Teerawat Donniart from Thailand and Phoukhong Khamsounthone of Laos.

Schedule
All times are Indochina Time (UTC+07:00)

Results

References

External links
Official website

Men's sanda 52 kg